This was the first edition of the tournament.

Romain Arneodo and Andrei Vasilevski won the title after defeating Gonçalo Oliveira and Andrea Vavassori 7–6(7–2), 2–6, [15–13] in the final.

Seeds

Draw

References
 Main draw

Orlando Open - Doubles